Marvin Williams may refer to:

Marvin Williams (born 1986), American basketball player
Marvin Williams (basketball, born 1993), American basketball player
Marvin Williams (American football) (born 1963), retired American football player
Marvin Williams (footballer) (born 1987), English football (soccer) player
Marvin Williams (baseball) (1920–2000), Negro league baseball player
 Marvin Williams (politician), program manager for the United States Commission on the Social Status of Black Men and Boys

See also 
 Martin Williams (disambiguation)
 William Marvin (1808–1902), American judge and Governor of Florida